The Robinson R66 is a helicopter designed and built by Robinson Helicopter Company. It has five seats, a separate cargo compartment and is powered by a Rolls-Royce RR300 turboshaft engine. The R66 is slightly faster and smoother than the Robinson R44 from which it is derived. The R66 received both type and production certificates from the U.S. Federal Aviation Administration (FAA) on October 25, 2010.

Development
Announced in 2007, the R66 was designed to be the company's first turbine-powered product and to extend its product range to compete with larger helicopters manufactured by Bell Helicopter and Eurocopter. Most of the R66 design is based on the earlier piston-engine R44.

Robinson started taking orders for the R66 in February, 2010. It went into preliminary production in 2010, and full production in 2011. The existing two-seat R22 and four-seat R44 continued in production. A four-seat police version of the R66 has entered production with a forward looking infrared (FLIR) camera system, searchlight, and external public address (PA) system as standard equipment.

In 2012, Robinson delivered 191 R66s while Robinson's competitors in the light single turbine sector delivered only 40 units between them. About 70 percent of the R66 production is exported. In 2014, the production rate slowed to about two R66s per week for a total of 101 for the year. In 2015, Robinson produced three R66s per week. RHC has contracted with Rolls-Royce to supply 100 RR300 turbines per year for 10 years.

Russia certified the R66 in March 2013, while Canada certified it in June 2013. European EASA and Chinese CAAC certifications were granted in the second quarter of 2014.

The R66 Turbine Marine with pop-out floats was FAA certified in November 2014. A journalist pilot described ground landing with them as "better than the standard R66". Retrofit floats are not available for the standard R66.

A cargo hook was approved in the EU and the United States in 2015.

In December 2015 Robinson announced it had sold 700 R66s.

On July 13, 2017, Robinson announced certification of the R66 Turbine Newscopter (R66 ENG).

On 25 January 2017 Robinson announced that it had delivered its 12,000th aircraft, an R66 to a charter and tour operator, Fly Karoo Air Services.

On 17 July 2017, Robinson introduced the TB17 lithium-ion phosphate battery as optional equipment.

The company delivered the 1,000th R66 in August 2020.

Design
The R66 is a single-engined helicopter with two-bladed main and tail rotors, and a fixed skid landing gear. The R66 is constructed from advanced composites, aluminum alloy (sheet), and chromoly steel. Like the R44, the R66 has both electromechanical instruments and optional digital glass cockpit.

The RR300 engine is more compact and lighter than the Lycoming O-540 six-cylinder piston engine that powers the R44—the R66 has a lower empty weight than the R44. The RR300 has a simplified single-stage centrifugal compressor which makes it less expensive and is expected to result in lower maintenance costs.

At Heli Expo 2018, Robinson introduced a cargo hook as an optional equipment. It is currently available in two variants.

Operators
The aircraft is operated by law enforcement, companies and private individuals.

National Disaster Management Authority

 Nigerian Air Force

Specifications

See also

References

External links

 Robinson Helicopter Company
 Fabrication area, page 32-35
 

2000s United States helicopters
2000s United States civil utility aircraft
R66
Single-turbine helicopters
Aircraft first flown in 2007